Sterphus cybele is a species of Hoverfly in the family Syrphidae.

Distribution
Colombia, Peru.

References

Eristalinae
Insects described in 1951
Diptera of South America
Taxa named by Frank Montgomery Hull